Atlético de San Juan FC are an association football club from San Juan, Puerto Rico. A newly formed club, they will play in the Puerto Rico Soccer League, the island's first unified football competition. They will play their home matches at the 18,000 capacity Hiram Bithorn Stadium, which has been traditionally used for baseball.

History

Puerto Rico Soccer League
2008 Season
Atlético de San Juan opened the season against Club Atletico River Plate Puerto Rico in the Hiram Bithorn Stadium, following an opening ceremony which lasted over one hour. The game was dominated by River Plate, who won 2-0. Following this defeat the team considered several adjustments, including changing the starting lineup. Atlético de San Juan won its second game against Academia Quintana, three goals to two. On July 19, 2008, the team defeated Tornados de Humacao 9-0. The team lost to Sevilla FC in their fourth game, losing one goal to nil. On the fifth date of the tournament the team tied with Guaynabo Fluminense FC, with both teams scoring four goals a piece. On August 10, 2008, Atléticos defeated Gigantes de Carolina. This marked the end of the league's first half, the teams then compete against each other a second time. In the first two games of this stage, Atléticos de San Juan defeated Caguas Huracán and lost to River Plate. To close the regular season, the team won 2, lost 2 and tied 1 game. One of these wins was against Sevilla FC, who were the last undefeated team in the tournament.

2009 Season
Atletico de San Juan started the 2009 season with a 2-0 win against Guaynabo Fluminense FC.
 Having a really good year, ending fourth in the league table. In the Play off finishing runner up champion. Losing in aggregate score 3-2 against Bayamon FC.

Stadium

 They currently play in Hiran Bithorn Stadium, sharing it with Academia Quintana.

Current squad

Club hierarchy

Atlético de San Juan Ltd.

Chairman: Roberto Lucena

Atlético de San Juan plc.

Vice President : Ricardo Carillo

Club treasure  : Antonio Martínez

Club Secretary : Carmen Carillo

Achievements

Puerto Rico Soccer League: 0
Runners-up (1): 2009

References

External links

Association football clubs established in 2008
Football clubs in Puerto Rico
Puerto Rico Soccer League teams
2008 establishments in Puerto Rico